The 2020 Formula 4 UAE Championship was the fourth season of the Formula 4 UAE Championship, a motor racing series for the United Arab Emirates regulated according to FIA Formula 4 regulations, and organised and promoted by the Automobile & Touring Club of the UAE (ATCUAE) and AUH Motorsports.

It began with a non-championship round on 28 November 2019 at the Yas Marina Circuit and finished on 7 March 2020.

Teams and drivers

Race calendar
The schedule consisted of 20 races over 5 rounds. Prior to start of the season a non-championship Trophy Round was held in support of the 2019 Abu Dhabi Grand Prix. All rounds were held in the United Arab Emirates.

The series was run as a winter series per FIA regulations, allowing drivers to participate in the UAE Championship and a European F4 series, both earning points towards an FIA Super Licence, as the end of this season was before the primary European F4 series were to begin their 2020 seasons. However, the championship would not award Super Licence points as not enough drivers were entered in the final round of the championship to meet the required threshold.

Championship standings
Points were awarded to the top 10 classified finishers in each race.

Drivers' Championship

Teams' championship
Ahead of each event, the teams nominate two drivers that accumulate teams' points.

Notes

References

External links
 F4 UAE Homepage

UAE
UAE F4
Formula 4 UAE Championship seasons